Tampa Union Station (TUS) is a historic train station in Tampa, Florida. It was designed by Joseph F. Leitner and was opened on May 15, 1912, by the Tampa Union Station Company. Its original purpose was to combine passenger operations for the Atlantic Coast Line, the Seaboard Air Line and the Tampa Northern Railroad at a single site. The station is located at 601 North Nebraska Avenue (SR 45).

In 1974, as Union Railroad Station, Tampa Union Station was added to the U.S. National Register of Historic Places and in 1988 it received local landmark status from the City of Tampa. After its condition deteriorated substantially, Tampa Union Station was closed in 1984; Amtrak passengers used a temporary prefabricated station building (nicknamed an "Amshack") located adjacent to the station platforms after the building was closed.

Tampa Union Station was restored and reopened to the public in 1998. Today it operates as an Amtrak station for the Silver Star line. It also provides Amtrak Thruway Motorcoach services to Orlando, Lakeland, Pinellas Park-St. Petersburg, Bradenton, Sarasota, Port Charlotte and Fort Myers.

When traveling either northbound or southbound, the train uses a wye to back into the stub-ended station and departs with the train pointing away from the depot.

Design

The station was originally built with eight tracks, although only one is in regular use today (designated as "Track 3"), with adjacent Track 2 also available for use by trains as needed. The construction of the new platform resulted in changes to track configurations at the station. Tracks 4, 5, and 6 were removed to facilitate the construction of the high-level platform, although there are plans to restore them in the future if demand warrants. Although some of the other tracks remain in place, they are out of service. Original track bumpers, constructed of poured concrete, are still located at the ends of several of the remaining tracks and at the ends of former tracks. Adjacent to each of these bumpers are concrete planters which have "TUS" cast into them.

Union Station consists of the main building which includes the waiting room, as well as an attached restaurant and baggage building. A detached express building located adjacent to the baggage building handled packages and freight transfers from trains to trucks (all structures remain on site with the exception of the express building, which was demolished in the 1970s).

At its opening, Union Station's waiting room was segregated (during the Jim Crow era, a wall across the center of the waiting room divided "white" and "colored" passengers, with separate entrances for each). Segregation remained a common practice in railroad stations in the South until it was stricken down by the Interstate Commerce Commission as a result of NAACP v. St. Louis-San Francisco Railway Company in 1955. However, like many train stations in the South, Tampa Union Station remained segregated to an extent even after the Interstate Commerce Commission's order. Passengers of intrastate trains were still bound by Jim Crow laws. During January 1956, the Tampa Times photographed signage at Union Station wherein the word "Intrastate" had been added beneath the old signage above the entrance to the so-called "colored" side of the waiting room. Full desegregation would not come until later. In fact, the Florida statute providing for segregation on railroads remained a law on the books as late as 1967, although by then the practice had fallen into disuse.

A train wash and car repair facility are also on the property. Both of these elements were added by Amtrak in the 1980s when Amtrak formerly maintained a Tampa maintenance base. However, both are largely unused today.

Ownership and management
The City of Tampa's Real Estate Division manages Tampa Union Station for the city. The Division has leased portions of the facility to private tenants, including a second floor office once occupied by the Pullman Company. Part of the former baggage building—which once housed the station's restaurant—is leased to a local real estate firm. Another portion of the baggage building (including the baggage storage and scale area) was leased to art gallery Flight 19 from 2004 to 2008, although it is currently vacant.

In September 2008, a permanent endowment for the care and upkeep of Tampa Union Station was established at the Community Foundation of Tampa Bay by a group of private donors. Income from the endowment goes to the City of Tampa to assist with the maintenance of the facility. Fundraising efforts for the endowment are on an ongoing basis.

Additionally, 2008 saw the founding of Friends of Tampa Union Station, an all volunteer, nonprofit organization which advocates for the preservation and use of Tampa Union Station as both a landmark and transportation asset. The group was founded in cooperation with the City of Tampa and the Florida Coalition of Rail Passengers.

Restoration
Tampa Union Station was acquired in 1991 by the nonprofit Tampa Union Station Preservation & Redevelopment Inc. (TUSP&R) via a mortgage held by CSX, the freight railroad company which was the corporate descendant of its original railroad owners. TUSP&R raised over US$4 million for the building's restoration through grants and loans from sources including the Florida Department of Transportation (ISTEA funds), the City of Tampa (grant funds) and the National Trust for Historic Preservation (no interest loan). At the completion of the restoration by Rowe Architects Incorporated in 1998, the station reopened to Amtrak passengers and the public. CSX donated the station to the City of Tampa that same year.

During the course of the restoration, numerous abandoned documents from the Pullman Company, Tampa Union Station Company, and the Seaboard Air Line Railroad were discovered in the station. TUSP&R volunteers sorted these documents and preserved them by archiving them at the University of South Florida Library (USF) Special Collections Department and (in the case of the Pullman Company materials), the Newberry Library in Chicago.

Tributes
The City of Tampa's official Poet Laureate, James E. Tokley Sr., in 2009 authored a poem, "The Epic of Union Station" which commemorates Tampa Union Station's history. Mr. Tokley performed a dramatic reading of the poem at Union Station on May 9, 2009, as part of National Train Day festivities held at the station on that day.

On May 12, 2012, on the occasion of the station's Centennial celebration and National Train Day, Tampa Union Station was officially added to the National Register of Historic Railroad Landmarks by the National Railway Historical Society (NRHS). Officials of the NRHS presented a commemorative plaque to the station at the event which notes this designation.

Friends of Tampa Union Station remains active and the station continues to host a Friends group-organized Train Day event in May of each year.

Connections
Amtrak Thruway Motorcoach
Hillsborough Area Regional Transit; #2, #9, & #12.

See also

Transportation in Florida

Bibliography
McQuigg, Jackson. Tampa Union Station. Dover, NH: Arcadia Publishing, 1998. 
 Hillsborough County listings at National Register of Historic Places
 Florida's Office of Cultural and Historical Programs
 Hillsborough County listings
 Hillsborough County markers

References

External links

Friends of Tampa Union Station
Tampa Union Station (USA RailGuide -- TrainWeb)
Tampa Union Station on The Historical Markers Database
TampaGov: Tampa Union Station
Tampa Union Station Records at the University of South Florida

Tampa
Tampa
Railway stations in the United States opened in 1912
Tampa
Transportation in Tampa, Florida
Tampa
Amtrak Thruway Motorcoach stations in Florida
History of Tampa, Florida
Railway stations on the National Register of Historic Places in Florida
Union Station
1912 establishments in Florida
Transportation buildings and structures in Hillsborough County, Florida